Tuscan red is a shade of red that was used on some railroad cars, particularly passenger cars.

The color is most closely associated with the Pennsylvania Railroad, which used it on passenger cars and on its TrucTrain flatcars. It also was used extensively by the New South Wales Government Railways in Australia, in a similar fashion to the PRR. The Norfolk and Western Railway used it as an accent color on its J class steam locomotives. The Canadian Pacific Railway used it historically and painted its luxury revival cars in this color. It is also a Prismacolor colored pencil.

History

The first recorded use of Tuscan red as a color name in English was in the early 1800s (exact date uncertain).

The color was popular in the late 19th century but non-standardized. It became the ‘signature color’ of the Pennsylvania Railroad, which instituted specifications for its formulation. Before the 1880s, pigments extracted from Brazil wood were used in its manufacture, but these proved inadequate in terms of hiding power and stability.

A 1917 US National Bureau of Standards circular describes it as based on Indian red, which derives its color from iron oxides. The color was then modified by treatment with an alizarin lake pigment. The pigment's stability lent itself to hard use in applications such as rail cars, steam pipes, radiators, and machinery. Lower-cost imitations were made without iron oxides by using gypsum or whiting as a base and adding aniline dyes.

Variations
The traditional color Tuscan red is shown above.  The lighter tones of Tuscan red tend toward tan and beige.  The darker tones of  Tuscan red tend toward purplish tones. These purplish tones of Tuscan red are exemplified by the color deep Tuscan red, shown below.

Tuscan

Displayed at right is the color Tuscan.

The first recorded use of Tuscan as a color name in English was in 1887.

Tuscany

The color Tuscany is displayed at right.

The first recorded use of Tuscany as a color name in English was in 1922.

The source of this color is the "Pantone Textile Paper eXtended (TPX)" color list, color #16-1219 TPX—Tuscany.

Tuscan tan

Displayed at right is the color Tuscan tan.

The first recorded use of Tuscan tan as a color name in English was in 1926.

The normalized color coordinates for Tuscan tan are identical to café au lait and French beige, which were first recorded as color names in English in 1839 and 1927, respectively.

Tuscan brown

Displayed at right is the color Tuscan brown.

The first recorded use of Tuscan brown as a color name in English was in 1913.

The normalized color coordinates for Tuscan brown are identical to coffee, which was first recorded as a color name in English in 1695.

Medium Tuscan red

Medium Tuscan red is that tone of Tuscan red that is called Tuscan red in the ISCC-NBS color list.

See also
 List of colors

References

Shades of red
Shades of brown
Canadian Pacific Railway
Norfolk and Western Railway
Pennsylvania Railroad